Nordsachsen (English: North Saxony) is an electoral constituency (German: Wahlkreis) represented in the Bundestag. It elects one member via first-past-the-post voting. Under the current constituency numbering system, it is designated as constituency 151. It is located in northern Saxony, comprising the district of Nordsachsen.

Nordsachsen was created for the inaugural 1990 federal election after German reunification. Since 2021, it has been represented by René Bochmann of the Alternative for Germany (AfD).

Geography
Nordsachsen is located in northern Saxony. As of the 2021 federal election, it is coterminous with the district of Nordsachsen.

History
Nordsachsen was created after German reunification in 1990, then known as Delitzsch – Eilenburg – Torgau – Wurzen. In the 2002 and 2005 elections, it was named Delitzsch – Torgau-Oschatz – Riesa. It acquired its current name in the 2009 election. In the 1990 through 1998 elections, it was constituency 308 in the numbering system. From 2002 through 2009, it was number 152. Since 2013, it has been number 151.

Originally, the constituency comprised the districts of Delitzsch, Eilenburg, Torgau, and Wurzen. In the 2002 and 2005 elections, it comprised the districts of Delitzsch and Torgau-Oschatz as well as the municipalities of Hirschstein, Riesa, Stauchitz, Strehla, and Zeithain from the Riesa-Großenhain district. It acquired its current borders in the 2009 election.

Members
The constituency was first represented by Angelika Pfeiffer of the Christian Democratic Union (CDU) from 1990 to 1998. It was won by Richard Schuhmann of the Social Democratic Party (SPD) in 1998 and served until 2002, when it was won Manfred Kolbe of the CDU. Marian Wendt was elected in 2013 and re-elected in 2017. René Bochmann won the constituency for the AfD in 2021.

Election results

2021 election

2017 election

2013 election

2009 election

References

Federal electoral districts in Saxony
1990 establishments in Germany
Constituencies established in 1990
Nordsachsen